Máirín O'Donovan (born 22 February 1936), is an Irish actress, singer, and dancer. She is best known for her numerous roles in film and television, as well as on stage.

Early life
She was born to Frank O'Donovan and Kitty McMahon, two prominent workers in showbusiness. Her father became well known for portraying the character of Batty Brennan in the long-running soap opera The Riordans, and her uncle was writer and actor Harry O'Donovan. She spent much of her childhood either living with her aunt in Skerries or in a boarding school, as her parents spent much of their time touring. During the summer, however, O'Donovan toured with her parents. Whilst on these tours, she developed a great love for performing.

She married early at age 21, and because of this she gave up performing in order to raise her family. As her children grew up, O'Donovan gradually spent more and more time performing.

Filmography

Film

Television

Short films

References

1936 births
Living people
Actresses from Dublin (city)
Musicians from Dublin (city)
Irish women singers